Hibernia is an unincorporated community in Owen Township, Clark County, Indiana.

History
A post office was established at Hibernia in 1835, and remained in operation until it was discontinued in 1868. The community takes its name from Hibernia, a classical name for Ireland.

The community also has a (former) variant name, Solon.

Geography

References

Unincorporated communities in Clark County, Indiana
Unincorporated communities in Indiana
Louisville metropolitan area